United States gubernatorial elections were held in 1911, in eight states.

Kentucky, Louisiana, Maryland and Mississippi held their gubernatorial elections in odd numbered years, every 4 years, preceding the United States presidential election year.

Massachusetts and Rhode Island both elected its governors to a single-year term; this was the last time Rhode Island elected its governors to a single-year term, switching to two years from the 1912 election.

Arizona and New Mexico held their first gubernatorial elections on achieving statehood.

Results

References

 
November 1911 events